County of Gladstone was one of the five counties in the Northern Territory which are part of the cadastral divisions of Australia.

Gladstone County was one of the original three counties in the top end, and the only County not in the Darwin hinterland. The county was partly subdivided into Hundreds.

The county was centred on the Roper River at a time when the Roper River seemed to offer a great economic possibility. The county covers the traditional lands of the Ngalakan, Marra, and Mangarayi peoples. Main settlements in the County included Urapunga, Mataranka and Jilkminggan and  Ngukurr.

It ceased to exist in 1977 after changes caused by the passage and assent in 1976 of the following ordinances - the Crown Lands Ordinance 1976 (No 1 of 1977) and the Crown Lands (Validation of Proclamations) Ordinance 1976 (No 2 of 1977).

Name
Like the other Counties of the Northern Territory, Gladstone is named for a British Prime Minister, in this case the County was named after William Ewart Gladstone. Most of the Hundreds in the County are named after people and places associated with Gladstone.

Hundreds
The central part of the County was originally subdivided into Hundreds, but these have largely become redundant.
 Hundred of Douglas 
 Hundred of Reynolds
 Hundred of Fasque 
 Hundred of Flint
 Hundred of Glynne 
 Hundred of Hawarden

References

 
Counties of the Northern Territory